The Other 'Arf is a British television ITV sitcom series broadcast from 30 May 1980 to 30 March 1984. It stars John Standing as upper class Conservative politician Charles Latimer, MP, who begins a relationship with working class cockney fashion model Lorraine Watts (played by former model Lorraine Chase).

The series was produced by ATV (which later became Central Independent Television in 1982), and was screened by ITV.

DVD release

External links
.

1980 British television series debuts
1984 British television series endings
1980s British sitcoms
ITV sitcoms
Television series by ITV Studios
Television series by Fremantle (company)
Television shows produced by Associated Television (ATV)
Television shows produced by Central Independent Television
English-language television shows